İbrahim Ferdi Coşkun (born 20 April 1987) is a Turkish professional footballer who plays as a left winger for Gaziantep Ankasspor.

Career
Coşkun began his career with local club Gaziantepspor. He was loaned out to Gaskispor for two seasons from 2006 to 2008. In July 2011, he moved to Mersin İdman Yurdu after a long stint as a Gaziantepspor player.

References

External links

1987 births
Living people
Gaziantepspor footballers
Gaskispor footballers
Mersin İdman Yurdu footballers
Niğde Anadolu FK footballers
Turkish footballers
TFF First League players
Association football midfielders